Lenorah is an unincorporated community in Martin County, Texas, United States.  The ZIP Code for Lenorah is 79749.

The Grady Independent School District serves area students.

References

External links
 

Unincorporated communities in Texas
Unincorporated communities in Martin County, Texas